The Telia Grand Opening was a women's professional golf tournament on the Swedish Golf Tour, played as the season opening event between 1999 and 2007.
 
The tournament was until 2006 a pro-am with a limited field of 32, played jointly with the men's Swedish Golf Tour.

It was discontinued as part of the tour's major overhaul ahead of the introduction of the SAS Masters Tour in 2008.

Two players managed to defend their titles, Nina Reis and Anna Berg.

Winners

References

Swedish Golf Tour (women) events
Golf tournaments in Sweden